The Amami languages are a collection of dialect clusters spoken across the Amami Islands of Kagoshima Prefecture, Japan. All dialects are members of the Ryukyuan languages, specifically its northern branch.

Classification 
There are many distinct clusters of the Amami languages, most of which have their own ISO 639-3 codes:

 Amami Ōshima
 Northern Amami Ōshima
 Southern Amami Ōshima
 Kikai
 Tokunoshima
 Okinoerabu
 Yoron

Scholars are divided on the specific subgrouping of these dialects. The Okinoerabu and Yoron clusters may be grouped within the Kunigami language.

References 

Ryukyuan languages
Amami Islands